This is a list of parks in the city of Takoma Park, Maryland.

County parks

Gardens

Municipal parks
Municipal parks come under the administration of the City of Takoma Park, Department of Recreation.

Other parks
Municipal parks come under the administration of the City of Takoma Park, Department of Recreation.

See also 

Sligo Creek

Notes

References

Parks
Parks
Takoma Park parks
Takoma Park
Takoma Park, list
Parks in Montgomery County, Maryland